Dyer Airport  is a public use airport located six nautical miles (11 km) southeast of Dyer, in Esmeralda County, Nevada, United States. It is owned by the U.S. Bureau of Land Management.

Facilities and aircraft 
Dyer Airport covers an area of 156 acres (63 ha) at an elevation of 4,899 feet (1,493 m) above mean sea level. It has one runway designated 12/30 with a dirt surface measuring 2,870 by 50 feet (875 x 15 m).

For the 12-month period ending November 30, 2010, the airport had 240 general aviation aircraft operations, an average of 20 per month. At that time there were five aircraft based at this airport, all single-engine.

See also 
 List of airports in Nevada

References

External links 
 Dyer Airport (2Q9) diagram from Nevada DOT
 Aerial image as of September 1998 from USGS The National Map
 
 

Airports in Nevada
Transportation in Esmeralda County, Nevada
Buildings and structures in Esmeralda County, Nevada
Bureau of Land Management